Appointment with Life (Maw`ed Ma` al-Hayat) is a 1953 Egyptian drama film directed, written and produced by Ezz El-Dine Zulficar. The film stars Faten Hamama, Shoukry Sarhan and Shadia.

Plot 
(Faten Hamama) plays Amal, the only daughter of a famous doctor, who lives with Fatimah (Shadia). Fatimah has a crush on Mamdouh, Amal's father, and Amal is in love with Ahmed (Shoukry Sarhan), an engineer. Amal's father learns of a deadly disease that his daughter has, and decides to hide the truth from her. The doctors have told him that she has only about six months to live, if she can not be cured. Amal finds out and her father faces her with the truth. He requests a talented foreign specialist, who was actually able to cure her disease. She, after recovering, marries her longtime love, Ahmed.

Primary cast 
 Faten Hamama
 Shukry Sarhan
 Shadia
 Hussein Riad
 Omar El-Hareery

References 

1953 films
1950s Arabic-language films
1953 drama films
Egyptian drama films
Egyptian black-and-white films
Films directed by Ezz El-Dine Zulficar